Richmond Fire-Rescue is responsible for providing both fire and extrication services in Richmond, British Columbia. Richmond Fire-Rescue is also contracted to provide back up airside emergency response services to Vancouver International Airport as it is needed.

History 
Established in 1897, the Richmond Fire-Rescue Department's history can be traced back to the Steveston Fire Department created in 1912 for the Steveston canneries. This department had a full-time paid fire chief with 24 fire-fighters; it ceased to exists in about 1917 for unknown reasons. In 1922 the Brighouse Volunteer Fire Department was created and received a $100 grant from the Municipal Council. After 2 years of operation, in 1924, this department closed down. Due to the onset of WWII, the Air Raid Protection (A.R.P.) was established and encompassed the whole island in an organised fashion for the first time. Richmond was divided into 6 districts, each with its own brigade. When the war ended, the (A.R.P.) was disbanded and as with the other times when Richmond didn't have a fire department, the Vancouver Fire Department was responsible for fire protection. The Central Fire Committee was established in March 1946 when some of the former (A.R.P.) brigades started to reorganize under this committee. In June 1973 the last volunteer fire brigade, East Richmond, closed down and all of Richmond's fire fighters were now full time paid positions.

Senior Command

 1 Chief
 3 Deputy Chiefs
 Operations
 Administration/Finance
 Administration/Technology
 Chief Training Officer
 Chief Fire Prevention Officer

Fire Hall Locations and Apparatus 

There are currently 7 fire halls located throughout the City of Richmond, not including YVR; (one hall and 4 crash tenders belong to the Vancouver Airport Authority).

Once new fire hall No. 1 is completed in 2018, all of Richmond's public safety buildings will be built to post disaster standards. Fire hall No. 3 officially opened in October 2017 and is unique in that it is the first fire hall in a large British Columbia urban community to be combined with a BC Ambulance station. It is also expandable should the need arise in the future and there will be a white oak tree planted, grown from a seed from New York's 9/11 disaster site.

See also

 E-Comm, 9-1-1 call and dispatch centre for Southwestern BC
 Vancouver Fire and Rescue Services
 BC Ambulance Service

References

External links 
RFRD

Fire departments in British Columbia
Politics of Richmond, British Columbia